The 1983 Cardiff City Council election was held on Thursday 5 May 1983 to the district council known as Cardiff City Council, in Cardiff, South Glamorgan, Wales. It took place on the same day as other district council elections in Wales and England. The Conservative Party regained control of the council from the Labour Party.

The previous Cardiff City Council took place in 1979 and the next full elections took place in 1987.

Ward changes
This was the first election to be affected by the changes resulting from The City of Cardiff (Electoral Arrangements) Order 1982. Boundaries were redrawn and the number of electoral wards increased from 21 to 26, with a reduction in the numbers of councillors elected per ward. New wards of Butetown, Caerau, Cyncoed, Fairwater, Heath, Lisvane and St Mellons, Llandaff North, Llanrumney, Pentwyn, Radyr & St Fagans, Trowbridge and Whitchurch & Tongwynlais were introduced. The number of councillors reduced overall from 75 to 65.

Overview
Labour had been in control of the council for the previous four years, but at the 1983 election the Conservatives regained control. With 34 councillors, they had an overall majority of three. Winning only three seats, the SDP-Liberal Alliance did not perform as well as they expected.

Labour blamed the ward boundary changes for the outcome. The former Labour council leader, Cllr John Reynolds, suggested it was a good performance, considering the number of council seats available had been reduced particularly in Labour voting areas. The Alliance failed to win seats in wards such as Gabalfa and blamed this on UK politics dominating the contest (with a possible general election on the horizon).  The new Conservative council leader, Cllt Ron Watkiss, pledged to use the Tory majority to put some of the council's services out to private contractors. 

The next designated next Lord Mayor, Olwen Watkin and her designated deputy, Stan James, came top of the poll in Plasnewydd. Alliance husband and wife team, Mike German and Georgette German, won seats in neighbouring wards. Eileen Roberts, recently widowed by the death of Conservative MP Michael Roberts, won a council seat in Rhiwbina. 

|}

Ward Results
Contests took place in all twenty six wards.(a)(b)

Adamsdown (2 seats)

Butetown (1 seat)

Caerau (2 seats)

Canton (3 seats)

Cathays (3 seats)

Cyncoed (3 seats)

Ely (3 seats)

Fairwater (3 seats)

Gabalfa (1 seat)

Grangetown (3 seats)

Smith and Bowen were previously councillors for the South ward.

Heath (3 seats)

Milsom and Watkiss were previously councillors in the Llanishen ward.

Lisvane and St Mellons (1 seat)

Davies was the sitting councillor in the preceding ward of Lisvane, Llanedeyrn & St Mellons.

Llandaff (2 seats)

Llandaff North (2 seats)

Llanishen (3 seats)

Representation reduced from six seats to three at this election.

Llanrumney (3 seats)

South Glamorgan councillor Vita Jones had recently defected from Labour to the SDP-Liberal Alliance.

Pentwyn (3 seats)

Plasnewydd (4 seats)

The number of seats available increased from three to four at this election.

Radyr & St Fagans (1 seat)

Clarke was the sitting councillor for Radyr St Fagans & Tongwynlais. Drew was a councillor in the Rumney ward.

Rhiwbina (3 seats)

Riverside (3 seats)

Roath (3 seats)

Rumney (2 seats)

Splott (2 seats)

Trowbridge (2 seats)

English and Michael were previously councillors in a larger Rumney ward.

Whitchurch & Tongwynlais (4 seats)

(a) Elections Centre source also compares the percentage vote of the lead candidate for each party in the ward.
(b) South Wales Echo source also indicates existing councillors "but, because of boundary changes, not necessarily representing the ward being contested". It gives middle initials. It lists the 'green' candidates as "Ecology" and the 'Liberal/SDP' as "Alliance".

* existing councillor, for the same ward
o existing councillor, though because of boundary changes not for the same ward

References

Council elections in Cardiff
Cardiff City Council
1980s in Cardiff
Council elections in South Glamorgan